Benjamin Jones (April 13, 1787 – April 24, 1861) was a U.S. Representative from Ohio for two terms from 1833 to 1837.

Biography 
Born in Winchester, Virginia, Jones moved with his parents to Washington, Pennsylvania.
He received a limited schooling. He learned the trade of cabinetmaking. He moved to Wooster, Ohio, in 1812 and engaged in mercantile pursuits.  He was a Justice of the Peace in 1815, and commissioner for Wayne County in 1818.  He served in the Ohio House of Representatives in 1821–1822, and in the Ohio Senate from 1829 to 1832. Ohio Presidential elector in 1828 for Andrew Jackson.

Congress 
Jones was elected as a Democrat to the Twenty-third and Twenty-fourth Congresses (March 4, 1833 – March 3, 1837). He served as chairman of the Committee on Expenditures in the Department of War in the Twenty-fourth Congress.  He was not a candidate for renomination.

Later career and death 
He resumed business interests in Wooster, and died there April 24, 1861. He was interred in Oak Hill Cemetery.

Sources

1787 births
1861 deaths
Democratic Party members of the Ohio House of Representatives
Democratic Party Ohio state senators
Politicians from Winchester, Virginia
People from Wooster, Ohio
1828 United States presidential electors
Jacksonian members of the United States House of Representatives from Ohio
Democratic Party members of the United States House of Representatives from Ohio
19th-century American politicians